Alexa Viscius is a multi-disciplinary artist from Chicago. She is a graphic designer, photographer, and art director. Viscius is the bassist for the band Bnny, fronted by her twin sister Jessica.

Career 
Viscius' work as a graphic designer has included creating posters for the band Dehd and co-creating the identity for Pitchfork Festival 2018 with her sister Jessica. She was the art director at Normal, a female-run studio in Chicago. Her photography has been featured in Pitchfork, The New York Times, and NME. In 2017, Jessica Viscius founded the music group Bnny, then called Bunny. Alexis joined as the group's bassist. Alexa and Jessica co-own and run Ramona's Market, a vintage re-sale shop in Chicago.

Personal life 
Viscius grew up in the suburbs of Chicago with her family, including twin sister Jessica. She completed a BFA from the University of Illinois at Chicago in 2011.

References 

Women bass guitarists
21st-century American bass guitarists
American rock bass guitarists
American women graphic designers
Living people
Date of birth missing (living people)
American women photographers
21st-century American photographers
University of Illinois Chicago alumni
American art directors
Artists from Chicago
Musicians from Chicago
Year of birth missing (living people)